Gammel Strand 42 is a historic property overlooking Slotsholmens Kanal and Slotsholmen in Copenhagen, Denmark. The building was listed on the Danish registry of protected buildings and places in 1945.

History

18th century

The property was listed in Copenhagen's first cadastre of 1689 as No. 12 in Strand Quarter. It was at that time owned by the king's furier Rudolf Boldevin. The property was again listed as No. 12 in the new cadastre of 1756 and was then owned by Thomas Morville.

Agent Hans Holck (1726-1783), who created the first city directory for Copenhagen, was among the residents in around 1782.

At the time of the 1787 census, No. 12 was home to four households. Friderich Christian Fries	, a naval officer with rank of captain lieutenant, resided in the building without any family or staff. Fridericha Magrethe Sal.Nissen, a 52-year-old widow, resided in another dwelling with her 24-year-old daughter Anne Agathe Nissen, two lodgers, a seamstress, three maids and an 11-year-old orphaned girl that she had adopted. Mette Claussen, widow of a justitsråd, resided in a third dwelling with her 13-year-old daughter Helena Ahemand, her sister Helena Maria Claussen, two maids, a male servant and a lodger. Petr Andersen, a junk dealer, resided in the basement with his wife Anne Chierstine, their two children (aged four and six), his mother Ellen Sørensen	and one maid.

Saabye and the new property
The property was destroyed in the Copenhagen Fire of 1795, together with most of the other buildings in the area. The current building on the site was constructed in  17991800 by master carpenter Christopher Crane for merchant Claus Saabye.

Saabye's property was home to four households at the 1801 census. The 30-year-old owner resided in one of the apartments with his widowed mother Mette Marie Barmeyer, a clerk and a maid. Knud Engelbreth Langberg, a general average adjuster (Dispacheur), resided in the building with his wife Birgitte Marie Jacobsen. Else Langberg (née Jacobsen), a widow, resided in a third apartment with her four children (aged four to 10), two clerks and two maids. The basement was home to 13 people, including an office courier, a fishmonger and a fisherman as well.

Salomonsen family
The property was listed in the new cadastre of 1806 as No. 11 in Strand Quarter. It was at that time owned by grocer (urtekræmmer) Samuel Moses Salomonsen (1778-1855). He was married to Malchen Henriques (1777-1835). a daughter of  Bendix Moses Henriques and a sister of among others Ruben Henriques Jr.

The surgeon Ludwig Lewin Jacobson was among the residents in 1816–18. Counter Admiral Lorentz Fjelderup Lassen lived in the building from 1834 and until his death in 1837. F.C. Bornemand (1810-1861), a professor of law at the University of Copenhagen, was a resident from 1840 to 1843.

The property was home to 10 residents in four households at the time of the 1840 census. Samuel Moses Salomonsenm whose wife had died in 1835, resided on the grounde floor with his housekeeper Sara Gottschalk, one maid, three employees and a caretaker. Moritz Salomonsen resided alone on the first floor. Peder Jacobsen Tetens, a landvæsenskommissær and judge in Hog- og Stadsretten, resided on the second floor with his wife Sofie Tetens (née Tetens) and one maid. Fredrik Christian Bornemann, a jurist at the University of Copenhagen, resided on the third floor with his wife Marie Bornemann (née Engelstoft) and one maid.

 
The property was home to 20 residents in three households at the time of the 1845 census. Samuel M. Salomonsen shared the two lower floors with his son Moritz Salomonsen and daughter-in-law Frederikke Salomonsen (née Abrahamsen), their one-year-old son Emil Salomonsen, two housekeepers (husjomfruer), four employee's in the family's wholesale business, two male servants and three maids. Peter Tetens (1797-1859), a landvæsenskommissær), resided on the second floor with his wife Sophie Tetens, Sophie Tetens and one maid. Edvard Garriques, a merchant, resided on the third floor with his housekeeper Emilie Skibsted.

Gammel Strand 42 was home to 21 residents at the time of the 1860 census.Martin Salomonsen (1814-1889), a medical doctor, resided on the second floor with his wife Emma Salomonsen (née Henriques),their 13-year old son Carl Julius Salomonsen and two maids. Emilie Henriques (née Halle), a 55-year-old widow, resided on the first floor with her 31-year-old son 	Ludvig Emil Henriques and one maid. The 64-year-old Eduard Garriques was still residing in the third floor apartment with his wife Octavia Carriques (née Lassen) and one maid.	 Mathias Wolff, a businessman (vare- og vekselmægler), resided on the ground floor with his wife Andrea Wolff (née Collstrup), their two son (aged one and two) and two maids.	 Larsen Hansen, a grocer (urtekræmmer), resided in the basement with one apprentice and one maid.

 
Martin Salomonsen was still residing in one of the apartments in 1880. His son Carl Julius Salomonsen resided in another apartment with his wife Christian Ferdinand Nielsen. Lassen Hansen was still occupying the ground floor of the building. Frans Johannes Martins, a merchant (grosserer), resided in the fourth apartment with his wife Petra Ricarda Svendstrup	and their two-year-old daughter.

20th century
The building was acquired by Kristian Mikkelsen Vendsyssel in 1900. He had established his own fish wholesale business in Hjørring in 1887 but later moved the operation first to Frederikshavn and then in 1895 to Copenhagen. On 30 October 1898, together with Seattle-based Theodor Wilhelm Hansen (died 1916) and Frederikshavn-based Peder Morthensen Asp (died 1917), he had started a new venture, Vendsyssel Packing Co, which was involved in the salting of salmon on the American west coast for sale on the European markets. The company was in 1950 still based in the building.

The painters Harald Slott-Møller (1864-1937) and Agnes Slott-Møller lived in one of the apartments in the years around 1908.

Architecture
The building consists of four storeys over a raised cellar and is four bays wide. 
The facade of the ground floor and cellar is dressed in a grey colour while the upper floors stand in undressed, red masonry. A side wing extends from the rear of building and connects to a rear wing at the bottom of a narrow courtyard.

Today
The property was in 2012 purchased by a family trust created by Klaus Riskær Petersen9.

References

External links

 Source
 Source

Listed residential buildings in Copenhagen
Buildings and structures completed in 1800